Lithuania have sent a 131 person delegation to the 2019 European Games, in Minsk, Belarus to compete in 13 sports disciplines. The LTeam consisted of 42 sportsmen and 31 sportswomen, 30 coaches, 4 team leaders, 11 medical personnel, 3 delegation leaders and 10 other personnel.

Medalists

Archery

Recurve

Athletics

Men's
 Men's 100 m: Kostas Skrabulis 
 Men's 110 m Hurdles:  
 Men's 110 m Hurdles: Martynas Vrašinskas 
 Men's High Jump: Adrijus Glebauskas  
 Men's 4x400 m: Artūras Janauskas
 Men's 4x400 m: Rokas Pacevičius
 Men's Universal Relay: Benediktas Mickus  
 Men's Universal Relay: Gediminas Truskauskas  
 Men's Relay: Mindaugas Striokas  

Women's
 Women's 100 m: Karolina Deliautaitė 
 Women's 100 m: Akvilė Andriukaitytė  
 Women's 100 m Hurdles: Rasa Mažeikaitė  
 Women's Javelin: Liveta Jasiūnaitė  
 Women's Long Jump: Jogailė Petrokaitė  
 Women's Long Jump: Augustė Ragalaitė 
 Women's 4x400 m: Erika Krūminaitė  
 Women's 4x400 m: Modesta Justė Morauskaitė
 Women's Universal Relay: Eglė Balčiūnaitė  
 Women's Universal Relay: Eva Misiūnaitė  
 Women's Relay: Gabija Galvydytė  
 Women's Relay: Monika Elenska

Badminton

Basketball

 Men's 3x3 Team: Medas Kuprijanovas, Paulius Semaška, Mintautas Bulanovas, Gytis Radzevičius

Boxing

 Men's 60 kg - Edgaras Skurdelis
 Men's 75 kg - Vytautas Balsys
 Men's over 91 kg - Mantas Valavičius

Canoeing

Men's:
 C-1 1000 m: Vadim Korobov
 K-2 1000 m: Ričardas Nekriošius
 K-2 1000 m: Andrejus Olijnikas
 K-1 200 m: Artūras Seja
 C-2 1000 m; C-1 200 m: Henrikas Žustautas
 C-2 1000 m: Ilja Davidovskij

Women's:
 C-1 200 m: Rūta Dagytė

Cycling

Men's:
 Vasilijus Lendel - sprint 
 Svajūnas Jonauskas - keirin
 Gediminas Bagdonas - road race, time trial
 Ramūnas Navardauskas - road race
 Justas Beniušis - road race
 Venantas Lašinis - road race
 Rojus Adomaitis - road race

Women's:
 Simona Krupeckaitė - sprint, team sprint, keirin, 500 m
 Miglė Marozaitė - sprint, team sprint, keirin, 500 m
 Olivija Baleišytė - scratch, team, omnium, madison 
 Viktorija Šumskytė - madison, scratch, team, omnium 
 Rasa Leleivytė - road race
 Silvija Pacevičienė - road race, time trial

Gymnastics

 Apparatus; all-round: Robert Tvorogal

Judo

 Men's -100 kg - Karolis Bauža 
 Men's -73 kg - Kęstutis Vitkauskas 
 Andrejus Klokovas
 Women's +78 kg - Sandra Jablonskytė
 Women's +78 kg - Santa Pakenytė

Karate

No participants this year.

Sambo

 Men's 52 kg - Gintaras Katkus 
 Women's +80 kg - Karina Stefanovič

Shooting

 10 m Women's Air Pistol: Gabrielė Rankelytė, Jakaterina Ždanova
 25 m Women's pistol: Gabrielė Rankelytė, Jakaterina Ždanova
 Women's Skeet: Alisa Bogdanova 
 10 m Men's Air Rifle: Karolis Girulis
 Men's Skeet: Ronaldas Račinskas

Table tennis

Wrestling

Men's freestyle

Men's Greco-Roman

Women's freestyle

References

Nations at the 2019 European Games
European Games
2019